Hoys or HOYS may refer to:

 Horse of the Year Show
 Hoys Roadlines

See also 
 Hoy (disambiguation)